Uttar Pradesh Reorganisation Act, 2000 is an Act of the Parliament of India enacted in 2000 for creation of the state of Uttarakhand, then tentatively named Uttaranchal, out of Uttar Pradesh.  The law was introduced by NDA government headed by then PM Atal Bihari Vajpayee to fulfil their election promise.  Then President Kocheril Raman Narayanan signed the bill on 1 August 2000 and on 9 November 2000 Uttarakhand became the 27th state of the Republic of India.

References

Acts of the Parliament of India 2000
Vajpayee administration initiatives
Reorganisation of Indian states
History of Uttarakhand (1947–present)
History of Uttar Pradesh (1947–present)